Murad Musayev (born on 13 June 1994) is an Azerbaijani footballer who plays as a defender for Gabala in the Azerbaijan Premier League.

Club career
On 28 April 2013, Musayev made his debut in the Azerbaijan Premier League for Gabala match against Qarabağ.

Career statistics

Club

References

External links
 

1994 births
Living people
Association football defenders
Azerbaijani footballers
Azerbaijan youth international footballers
Azerbaijan Premier League players
Gabala FC players
Sabail FK players
Zira FK players